Tavarreh or Tavreh may refer to:
 Tavarreh, Khoy
 Tavreh, Showt

See also